Ali Pasha Mosque is a mosque in the centre of the town of Tokat in the Anatolia region of Turkey. It is a work of the Ottoman period, built in 1572 during the reign of Sultan Selim II, and has a single dome and a minaret.

It is part of complex which also includes a Turkish bath and a mausoleum. The tomb of Ali Pasha and his son Mustafa Bey is in the courtyard.

References 

Tokat
Mosques in Turkey
16th-century mosques